Thomas Chauncey Humphrey (December 20, 1846 – December 3, 1937) was an American politician. He was a member of the Arkansas House of Representatives, serving from 1875 to 1876 and from 1893 to 1895. He was a member of the Democratic party.

References

1937 deaths
Speakers of the Arkansas House of Representatives
Democratic Party members of the Arkansas House of Representatives
1846 births
People from Sebastian County, Arkansas
People from Logan County, Arkansas
19th-century American politicians